Bedross Der Matossian  is an associate professor of Modern Middle East history and the Hymen Rosenberg Associate Professor in Judaic Studies at the University of Nebraska-Lincoln. He is also the vice chair of the  Department of History. Der Matossian was born and raised in East Jerusalem. He is a graduate of the Hebrew University of Jerusalem, where he began his graduate studies in the Department of Islamic and Middle Eastern Studies. He completed his Ph.D. in Middle East History in the Department of Middle Eastern, South Asian, and African Studies at Columbia University in 2008. From 2008 to 2010, he was a lecturer of Middle East History in the Faculty of History at the Massachusetts Institute of Technology. For the Spring quarter 2014 he was appointed as the Dumanian Visiting professor in the University of Chicago. His areas of interest include ethnic politics in the Middle East, inter-ethnic violence in the Ottoman Empire, Palestinian history, and the history of Armenian Genocide. Der Matossian was the past president of the Society for Armenian Studies. He is also the series editor of "Armenians in the Modern and Early Modern World". published by I.B.Tauris and Bloomsbury Press.  He serves on the Board of Directors of multiple international educational institutions and on the editorial board of multiple journals, the most prominent of which is the flagship journal of the field: International Journal of Middle East Studies (IJMES).

Books
Der Matossian, Bedross 

Der Matossian, Bedross (2020), ed. The First Republic of Armenia (1918-1920) on its Centenary: Politics,Gender, and Diplomacy. The Press at California State University Fresno. .
Der Matossian, Bedross (2019) with Barlow Der Mugrdechian, eds. Western Armenian in the 21st Century: Challenges and New Approaches |The Press at California State University Fresno.  
Der Matossian, Bedross (2018). Sulaiman Mourad, and Naomi Koltun-Fromm, eds. Routledge Handbook on Jerusalem. Milton Park, Abingdon, Oxon; New York, NY :Routledge. .
Der Matossian, Bedross (2016). Hüsrana Uğrayan Devrim: Geç Dönem Osmanlı İmparatorluğu'nda Hürriyet ve Şiddet. Istanbul: İletişim Publications.

References

Armenian studies scholars
1978 births
Living people
University of Nebraska–Lincoln faculty
Scholars of Ottoman history
Historians of Armenia